Ervin Lamçe (born 11 September 1972) is an Albanian former footballer who played as a midfielder. He made three appearances for the Albania national team from 1995 to 1997.

References

External links
 

1972 births
Living people
Sportspeople from Tirana
Albanian footballers
Association football midfielders
Albania international footballers
KF Tirana players
VfL 93 Hamburg players
VfR Neumünster players
Albanian football managers
Albanian expatriate footballers
Albanian expatriate football managers
Albanian expatriate sportspeople in Germany
Expatriate footballers in Germany
Expatriate football managers in Germany